I-II-III are three compilation albums released by Icon of Coil in 2006. Each released separately as re-issues of their first 3 albums ('Serenity is the Devil', 'The Soul is in the Software' & remix album 'One Nation Under Beat'), 2 singles ('Shallow Nation' & 'Access And Amplify') and EP ('Seren EP'), which were all either out of print, or hard to find.

Track listings

I: Serenity is the Devil / Shallow Nation

 "Activate" - 5:26
 "Regret" - 5:04
 "Shallow Nation" - 4:46
 "Down on Me" - 4:05
 "Former Self" - 4:51
 "Everlasting" - 5:22
 "Situations Like These" - 4:23
 "Fiction" - 5:13
 "You Just Died" - 5:09
 "Floorkiller" - 9:21
 "Shallow Nation" (Original Version) - 4:18
 "Shallow Nation" (Club Mix) - 5:40
 "Floorkiller" - 6:20
 "Shallow Nation" (Radio Edit) - 3:50

II: Seren Ep / One Nation Under Beat

 "Situations Like These" (Single Version) - 9:08
 "Come Alive" - 6:14
 "Situations Like These" (Moonitor Remix) - 2:08
 "Everlasting" (Psyche Remix) - 9:11
 "Situations Like These" (Album Version) - 3:55
 "Situations Like These" (Edit) - 6:54
 "Former Self" (V.1.0) - 5:59
 "Brighter Day" (V.1.0) - 4:52
 "We Need" (Club Mix) - 7:17
 "Repeat it" (Apoptygma Berzerk Remix) - 4:10
 "Confront" (Floorkiller Remix by Epa) - 4:30
 "We Need" (Water Remix by Sector9) - 4:39
 "Former Self" (Radio Edit) - 4:37
 "Untitled Track" - 4:44

III: The Soul is in the Software / Access And Amplify

 "Comment" - 0:27
 "Thrillcapsule" - 6:03
 "Violations" - 4:32
 "In Absence" - 5:02
 "Access And Amplify" - 4:59
 "Everything is Real?" - 5:10
 "Other Half of Me" - 4:37
 "Love is Blood" - 5:41
 "Disconnect" - 3:53
 "Simulated" - 4:05
 "Access And Amplify" - 4:59
 "The Soul is in the B-Side" - 7:11
 "Access And Amplify" (Club Mix) - 7:43
 "Access And Amplify" (Hudlager Remix) - 5:22
 "Access And Amplify" (Edit) - 04:01

Credits
All songs written, produced and recorded by Icon of Coil.

References

2006 albums
Icon of Coil albums